Food Tank : A Food Think Tank, is a 501(c)(3) non-profit organization founded in 2013 by Danielle Nierenberg, Bernard Pollack, and Ellen Gustafson to reform the food system. Its goal is to highlight environmentally, socially, and economically sustainable ways of alleviating hunger, obesity, and poverty. 

Nierenberg is the winner of the 2020 Julia Child Award, which celebrates leaders who are impacting the world through food. Nierenberg was awarded the 2022 Food Policy Changemaker Award from The Hunter College NYC Food Policy Center for making significant strides to create healthier, more sustainable food environments and using food to promote community and economic development. Nierenberg is also one of NYU Steinhardt’s 2022 Scholars in Residence, a program that welcomes distinguished academics, artists, advocates, and other thought leaders to our community to share their expertise.

Conferences 
In 2015, Food Tank launched its first Food Tank Summit in Washington, D.C. Since then, Food Tank has been holding a series of summits in various cities focused on sustainability and equity in food systems. Food Tank has hosted summits in Boston, Chicago, New York City, Sacramento, San Francisco, Seattle, and Washington, D.C. The conferences gather experts across all sectors of the food industry including business, government, nonprofit organizations, farmers, unions, and chefs.

Advocacy 
Food Tank convened an official listening session in the lead-up to the White House Conference on Hunger, Nutrition and Health in 2022. The session explored the theme "Dismantling Silos to Strengthen Nutrition and Food Security Research" and key takeaways were compiled into a formal report for the White House’s consideration as they develop a strategy to end hunger, increase healthy eating and physical activity, and eliminate disparities.

Food Tank joined a coalition of non-governmental organizations and institutions including the Harvard Law School Food Law and Policy Clinic, WeightWatchers International Inc., Grubhub and the Natural Resources Defense Council to help build bipartisan support for the Food Donation Improvement Act, which was signed into law in January 2023. Food Tank's efforts included convening an event on Capitol Hill in partnership with WW, Bread for the World, the Harvard Law School Food Law and Policy Clinic (FLPC), and The Healthy Living Coalition where lawmakers, policy experts, and advocates fighting food waste called on Congress to pass the legislation.

Publications 
The organization's website is a publishing platform for news about the food industry and system, and it also provides research and analysis with the goal of building a science-based foundation for changing the food system. Topics covered include sustainable agriculture, climate change, food waste, urban agriculture, and policy and organizing.

In 2014, Food Tank partnered with the James Beard Foundation to publish an annual "Good Food Org Guide," a comprehensive directory of nonprofit organizations that are working toward a better food system.

Danielle Nierenberg writes a Forbes column around sustainable agriculture and food issues, which has covered topics like agroecology, food waste, and the U.N. Climate Conference.

Podcast 
In 2018, Food Tank launched an original podcast, "Food Talk with Dani Nierenberg," on which Nierenberg invites chefs, experts, and activists to outline their ideal food system—and how their projects are making a better food system more attainable.

Working Groups 
Food Tank built a working group of Chief Sustainability Officers representing more than 150 food businesses that convenes monthly to discuss trends and case studies, learn from guest speakers, network, and harness coalition opportunities. 

Food Tank's peer network of academic faculty and department directors meets bi-monthly and represents disciplines around food and environmental studies as well as nursing and medicine, marketing, nutrition, anthropology, labor, and religious studies. The institutions represented include land grant, liberal arts, HBCUs and Tribal Colleges, and community colleges.

Food Tank also convenes the Refresh Working Group, which brings together food, agriculture, and technology experts from across the United States to ensure the positive application and responsible use of emerging technologies and data across these sectors. The group’s goal is to ensure robust and healthy agriculture and food marketplaces where innovation thrives and where small and big players alike can drive positive improvements throughout the global food system.

United Nations Climate Conference 
At the U.N. Climate Conference (COP27) in Sharm El-Sheikh, Egypt, Food Tank partnered with all official food pavilions including the Food4Climate Pavilion with A Well-Fed World, Compassion in World Farming, FOUR PAWS, IPES-Food (International Panel of Experts on Sustainable Food Systems) and ProVeg International; the Food Systems Pavilion with Clim-Eat and 15 other partners; and the Food and Agriculture Pavilion with CGIAR, the U.N. Food and Agriculture Organization, and The Rockefeller Foundation.

Interactive Musical 
WeCameToDance is Food Tank's interactive original musical about the climate crisis. It was developed by Creative Producer Bernard Pollack with choreography by House of Jack, original language by David Peterson of "Game of Thrones", and original music by Grammy-nominated Rocky Dawuni.

The show debuted a month-long run at 2021 Edinburgh Fringe Festival and is commissioned perform at the U.N. Climate Change Conference (COP26) in Glasgow.

During its initial run, WeCameToDance was featured in the New York Times, The List, Scotsman, The Herald (Scotland), and Edinburgh Reporter and the cast performed live on Good Morning Britain, Al Jazeera, and the BBC.

References 

Non-profit organizations based in Louisiana